Gary A. Hoover (born August 1968) is an American professor of economics and director of the Murphy Institute at Tulane University. From January 2015 until December 2020 he was a professor and Chair of the Economics Department at the University of Oklahoma. He was the first and only African American ever hired in that department. In August 1998 he joined the Department of Economics, Finance and Legal Studies at the University of Alabama. He was the first and only African American ever hired in that department, on the tenure track. He was tenured in August 2004 and in 2005 became the Assistant Dean for Graduate Student and Faculty Development in the  Culverhouse College of Commerce while maintaining full teaching and research duties. He was granted full professor in August 2010. In March 2017 he founded and became the Editor-in-Chief of the Journal of Economics, Race, and Policy. He has published extensively on race and inequality in the United States, and is a leading scholar on plagiarism and other types of misconduct in the economics profession.

Education and early life 

Hoover was born and raised in Milwaukee, Wisconsin. After attending Rufus King High School, he joined the Army in 1986 and was assigned to Fort Carson in Colorado. He used funding from the G.I. Bill to pay for his college education at the University of Wisconsin-Milwaukee, where he completed a B.A. degree in economics in 1993, followed by M.A. and PhD degrees in economics from Washington University in St. Louis in 1995 and 1998.

Career 

Hoover taught at the University of Alabama from 1998 until 2014, where he was a William White McDonald Family Distinguished Faculty Fellow from 2006 - 2014. He joined the University of Oklahoma as chair of the Department of Economics in January 2015 and was appointed a President's Associates Presidential Professor in 2017. He is the founding editor of the Journal of Economics, Race and Policy. From 2018 until 2020 he was the vice president of the Southern Economic Association. Since 2013 he has been co-chair of the Committee on the Status of Minority Groups in the Economics Profession.

Research

Poverty/Income Distribution Research  
His earlier works dealt mostly with local government operations and efficiencies. He published works examining how different cities distributed liquor licenses based on demand side factors and how different cities benefited from labor cost savings by privatizing their refuse removal services. He would continue to do this local government research throughout his career. He published works examining whether student performance improved based on school officials being elected or appointed to their positions. He also examined whether state level tobacco taxes were set for reasons other than maximizing tax revenue and how states determined clear indoor air laws along with laws restricting youth from tobacco products.

He also began exploring the implications of policy on poverty. This research explored the idea of whether economic growth was really associated with poverty reduction and whether robust economic growth would lead to robust reductions in poverty. The results seemed to be promising for those close to the poverty line but not those further away. His work on growth and poverty led him to examine whether there were racial aspects missing from the discussion and also whether measures of poverty which were distribution sensitive, such as the Sen Index, mattered.

His earlier works on growth and poverty led him to realize that the area could not be adequately addressed unless he expanded out to examine the entire income distribution and included more discussions of race and ethnicity. He would go on to publish works which examined gender differences in income inequality among immigrants and how government income maintenance programs impacted racial and ethnic groups income inequality differently. Hoover would publish works on racial and ethnic differences in income inequality by region of the country and the impact of banking deregulation on racial income inequality. In 2011, he published research examining the link between Economic Freedom and growth. The paper showed a positive but tenuous relationship. He would later do research examining the distributional aspects of Economic Freedom which showed no statistical gains to the lower quintiles of the income distribution. He also examined whether Economic Freedom reduced or expanded the racial income gap. His research showed that the gap widened because the positive benefits were received by non-Black citizens while Black incomes were unaffected.

Plagiarism and Unethical Behavior Research 
In June 2004, Hoover published an article outlining how he had been the victim of professional plagiarism of his previous works on growth and poverty. Hoover stated that the editor of the journal where he had submitted the work was unwilling to punish the plagiarist so he and his co-author did a survey of other journal editors to see if this sentiment was common. He stated that he was so shocked by the results and the thinking of editors regarding this issue that it became a field of study. Since then he has surveyed editors in other fields such as management, political science, and other social sciences. He has also surveyed rank-and-file professional economists along with rank-and-file professionals in management research. He is considered a leading expert in this area and often lectures other economics departments about the issue. He sits on the RePec plagiarism board. To date, he has published 7 peer-reviewed academic articles on the subject.

Selected works 

 Enders, Walter, Gary A. Hoover, and Todd Sandler. "The changing nonlinear relationship between income and terrorism." Journal of Conflict Resolution 60, no. 2 (2016): 195-225.
 Compton, Ryan A., Daniel C. Giedeman, and Gary A. Hoover. "Panel evidence on economic freedom and growth in the United States." European Journal of Political Economy 27, no. 3 (2011): 423-435.
 Enders, Walter, and Gary A. Hoover. "The Nonlinear Relationship Between Terrorism and Poverty." American Economic Review 102, no. 3 (2012): 267-72
 Hoover, Gary A., and Paul Pecorino. "The political determinants of federal expenditure at the state level." Public Choice 123, no. 1-2 (2005): 95-113.
 Hoover, Gary A. "Whose line is it? Plagiarism in economics." Journal of Economic Literature 42, no. 2 (2004): 487-493.

Economics Profession and Race/Ethnicity 
Hoover became co-chair of the Committee on the Status of Minority Groups in the Economics Profession (CSMGEP) in 2013. The CSMGEP has a website which lists minority job candidates in economics, publishes a yearly newsletter titled the Minority Report, and provides links and resources for making the economics profession more diverse. It also runs three programs to increase the representation of Blacks in the profession: a Summer Training Program, a Mentoring Program, and a Summer Economics Fellows Program. Yet, data compiled in CSMGEP's annual reports show that the percentage of PhD degrees in economics conferred to Blacks tends to hover around 2-3%, reaching a high of 3.9% in academic year 2017-8. Hoover has written and lectured extensively about the difficulties for African Americans in the economics profession. In October 2020, Hoover and fellow CSMGEP co-chair Ebonya Washington pushed the American Economic Association to implement 5 new programs on diversity including an undergraduate essay prize in honor of Andrew Brimmer, a travel grant for underrepresented minorities, and a seed grant for economics departments to start programs aimed at diversity and inclusion.

References 

African-American economists
University of Wisconsin–Milwaukee alumni
Washington University in St. Louis alumni
Living people
Rufus King International High School alumni
1968 births